Theo Merkel (16 April 1934 – 25 December 2002) was a German biathlete. He competed at the 1968 Winter Olympics and the 1972 Winter Olympics.

References

External links
 

1934 births
2002 deaths
German male biathletes
Olympic biathletes of West Germany
Biathletes at the 1968 Winter Olympics
Biathletes at the 1972 Winter Olympics
People from Traunstein (district)
Sportspeople from Upper Bavaria